The 2016 United States presidential election in Nevada was held on Tuesday, November 8, 2016, as part of the 2016 United States presidential election in which all 50 states plus the District of Columbia participated. Nevada voters chose electors to represent them in the Electoral College via a popular vote, pitting the Republican Party's nominee, businessman Donald Trump, and running mate Indiana Governor Mike Pence against Democratic Party nominee, former Secretary of State Hillary Clinton, and her running mate Virginia Senator Tim Kaine. Nevada has six votes in the Electoral College.

Clinton won the state with 47.92% of the vote, while Trump won 45.5%, which represents a tight margin between the two. Clinton's vote share marked a considerable decline from the vote shares Barack Obama got from the state in 2008 and 2012. With his overall victory in the presidential election, Trump became the first Republican since William Howard Taft in 1908 to win the presidency without Nevada, and the first since William McKinley in 1900 to do so without carrying Washoe County. , this was the only election cycle since 1976, and only the second since 1908, in which Nevada has voted for the losing presidential candidate. This is also the only election since 1976 in which Nevada voted to the left of Michigan.

Primary elections

Democratic caucuses

The 2016 Nevada Democratic caucuses took place on February 20 in the U.S. state of Nevada, traditionally marking the Democratic Party's third nominating contest in their series of presidential primaries ahead of the 2016 presidential election.

With all other candidates having dropped out of the race ahead of the Nevada caucuses, the two remaining candidates were Bernie Sanders and Hillary Clinton.

Process
Of the total number of 43 delegates the Nevada Democratic Party may send to the 2016 Democratic National Convention, 35 are pledged and 8 are unpledged.

The delegate selection process is a system with three levels:
 The first step in the delegate selection process were the precinct caucuses on February 20, which elected about 12,000 delegates to the county conventions.
 At the county conventions on April 2, the county delegates selected about 4,000 delegates to the state convention.
 At the state convention on May 14–15, the final 35 pledged delegates to the National Convention will be selected. 23 of them are allocated proportionally based on congressional district results, whereas the remaining 12 are allocated based on the state convention as a whole.

A majority of participants at the February caucuses supported Hillary Clinton. However, the county conventions on April 2, 2016, resulted in more Sanders delegates than Clinton delegates being sent to the state convention in May.

Debates and forums

October 2015 debate in Las Vegas 

On October 13, 2015, the Democratic Party's first debate was held at the Wynn Hotel in Las Vegas. Hosted by Anderson Cooper, it aired on CNN and was broadcast on radio by Westwood One. Participants were the candidates Hillary Clinton, Bernie Sanders, Jim Webb, Martin O'Malley, and Lincoln Chafee. It was the only debate appearance of Chafee and Webb, who ended their campaigns on October 23 and October 20, respectively.

February 2016 forum in Las Vegas 

On February 18, MSNBC and Telemundo hosted a forum in Las Vegas.

Caucus Results

County Conventions
The County Conventions were marked by bickering between Clinton and Sanders supporters, most notably in Clark County, which had been won by Clinton during the caucuses and led to the attempted arrest of the head of the credentials committee, Sanders supporter Christine Kramar, after the Clinton supporters on the Clark County Democratic committee attempted to depose her from her position. Kramar had discovered that the Clark County Democratic Party had been having private correspondence with only Clinton's campaign, as opposed to both campaigns.

The results statewide goes as follows: 
Sanders  3846 (55.23%)
Clinton 2124  (44.77%)

Sanders won most of the northern counties in Nevada, including Washoe County, and Clinton won most of the southern counties, including Clark County.

State Convention
The state convention was held in May as the final stage of the delegate selection process. Supports of Senator Sanders were angered when Party officials declined to accept the credentials of close to 60 pro-Sanders delegates. Nevada Democratic Party Chairwoman, Roberta Lange, allegedly received numerous death threats and threats to the lives of her family and grandchildren; a criminal investigation has yet to confirm these claims or the identities of those allegedly involved. At the convention, Sanders supporters protested until the staff cancelled the event. The event was later criticized as being violent, although there is no evidence that violence occurred.

Despite charges by Sanders supporters that the convention was rigged against their candidate, according to Jon Ralston, "the facts reveal that the Sanders folks disregarded rules, then when shown the truth, attacked organizers and party officials as tools of a conspiracy to defraud the senator of what was never rightfully his in the first place." After Sanders campaign Chair Jeff Weaver repeated assertions of process-rigging by Democratic Party officials, Politifact examined the evidence and concluded that, while the Party's selection process was "arcane" and "incredibly confusing", the fact is that "Clinton’s supporters simply turned out (attended the Convention) in larger numbers and helped her solidify her delegate lead." Moreover, according to Politifact: "There’s no clear evidence the state party 'hijacked' the process or ignored 'regular procedure.'"

The Nevada Democratic Party wrote to the Democratic National Committee accusing Sanders supporters of having a "penchant for extra-parliamentary behavior — indeed, actual violence — in place of democratic conduct in a convention setting." Sanders responded by denouncing the alleged use of violence while asserting that they were not treated with "fairness and respect" in a statement.

In a TV segment, comedian Samantha Bee reported on the fracas, as did Last Week Tonight with John Oliver and Late Night with Seth Meyers in "A Closer Look" segment.

Republican caucus

Delegates from Nevada to the Republican National Convention were allocated proportionally based on the caucus results.

General election

Polling

From the first poll conducted in May 2016, and throughout the summer, the race was a complete tossup with neither Clinton nor Trump having a large lead. Clinton won most polls in the summer by 1-2 points. From late September till October 20, Clinton won or tied in every poll. On October 20, Trump won a poll 47% to 44%. The race was neck and neck until election day, with neither candidate taking a significant lead. The average of the final 3 polls had Clinton up 45.6% to 45% for Trump.

Predictions
The following are final 2016 predictions from various organizations for Nevada as of Election Day.

Results

By county

By congressional district
Clinton and Trump each won 2 of the state's 4 congressional districts, with Trump carrying a district that elected a Democrat in the same cycle.

Analysis
Hillary Clinton won the state over nationwide winner Donald Trump, marking the third presidential election in a row that Nevada has voted Democratic. Most counties in the state of Nevada are rural, and voted heavily for Trump. As a whole, the rural counties outside of Las Vegas and Reno gave Donald Trump a 66-27 margin. However, Clinton won the state's two most populous counties, Clark County and Washoe County, which contain about 85% of the state's population, and thus won the state's electoral votes. Compared to 2012, Clinton's margin of victory was narrower in these two counties and statewide.

This is the second time since 1908, and the first time since 1976, that Nevada voted for a candidate who did not win the general election.

See also
United States presidential elections in Nevada

References

External links
 RNC 2016 Republican Nominating Process 
 Green papers for 2016 primaries, caucuses, and conventions
 Green papers for the 2016 Nevada caucuses and convention

Nevada
2016
Presidential